The Jets de Viry-Essonne were an ice hockey team in Viry-Chatillon, France. The club was founded in 1951 as the hockey department of the US Métro sports club, and took on the name OHC Paris-Viry in 1971. The club was dissolved in 2011, and were replaced by Viry Hockey 91, which began play in the FFHG Division 3 in 2011-12. 

They played in the top-level of French ice hockey from 1971-1987, with the exception of 1975, when they played in the Nationale 1B. They also participated in the top-level French league yearly from 1991-2001.

Achievements
French runner-up : 1980.
FFHG Division 1 champion : 1975, 1988, 1991.
FFHG Division 2 champion : 1983

External links
Club profile on eurohockey.net

Ice hockey teams in France
Ice hockey clubs established in 1951
1951 establishments in France